Waymart Wind Farm is the second largest wind farm in Pennsylvania, United States. It consists of 43 GE 1.5 MW wind turbines, with a total net capacity of 64.5 MW, "which is enough renewable energy to power more than 21,000 Pennsylvania homes." The project is located in Wayne County, Pennsylvania. The wind farm was developed by Atlantic Renewable Energy and constructed by NextEra Energy Resources. In January 2018 the project was sold to Huntsman Wind LLC.  Energy from the wind farm is sold to Exelon for distribution in the Mid-Atlantic region.

References

See also

Wind power in Pennsylvania

Energy infrastructure completed in 2003
Buildings and structures in Wayne County, Pennsylvania
Wind farms in Pennsylvania
NextEra Energy